The following is an alphabetical list of topics related to the Federated States of Micronesia.

0–9

.fm – Internet country code top-level domain for the Federated States of Micronesia

A
Airports in the Federated States of Micronesia
Atlas of the Federated States of Micronesia

B

C
Capital of the Federated States of Micronesia:  Palikir
Categories:
:Category:Federated States of Micronesia
:Category:Buildings and structures in the Federated States of Micronesia
:Category:Communications in the Federated States of Micronesia
:Category:Federated States of Micronesia culture
:Category:Economy of the Federated States of Micronesia
:Category:Education in the Federated States of Micronesia
:Category:Federated States of Micronesia-related lists
:Category:Geography of the Federated States of Micronesia
:Category:Government of the Federated States of Micronesia
:Category:History of the Federated States of Micronesia
:Category:Federated States of Micronesia people
:Category:Politics of the Federated States of Micronesia
:Category:Society of the Federated States of Micronesia
:Category:Sports in the Federated States of Micronesia
:Category:Transportation in the Federated States of Micronesia
commons:Category:Federated States of Micronesia
Chuuk
Cities in the Federated States of Micronesia
Coat of arms of the Federated States of Micronesia
Communications in the Federated States of Micronesia
Compact of Free Association with the United States of America

D
Demographics of the Federated States of Micronesia
Diplomatic missions in the Federated States of Micronesia
Diplomatic missions of the Federated States of Micronesia

E
Eastern Hemisphere (located in)
Economy of the Federated States of Micronesia
Education in the Federated States of Micronesia
Elections in the Federated States of Micronesia

F

Federated States of Micronesia
Flag of the Federated States of Micronesia
FM – ISO 3166-1 alpha-2 and USPS country code for the Federated States of Micronesia
Foreign relations of the Federated States of Micronesia
FSM – ISO 3166-1 alpha-3 country code for the Federated States of Micronesia

G
Geography of the Federated States of Micronesia
Gross domestic product

H
Health in the Federated States of Micronesia
Health care in the Federated States of Micronesia
History of the Federated States of Micronesia

I
International Organization for Standardization (ISO)
ISO 3166-1 alpha-2 country code for Federated States of Micronesia: FM
ISO 3166-1 alpha-3 country code for Federated States of Micronesia: FSM
ISO 3166-2:FM region codes for Federated States of Micronesia
Internet in the Federated States of Micronesia
Island countries

J

K
Kosrae

L
Law enforcement in the Federated States of Micronesia
Lists:
Diplomatic missions of the Federated States of Micronesia
List of airports in the Federated States of Micronesia
List of archipelagos
List of cities in the Federated States of Micronesia
List of countries by GDP (nominal)
List of countries without an army
List of diplomatic missions in the Federated States of Micronesia
List of Federated States of Micronesia-related topics
List of island countries
List of island countries by area
List of island countries by population density
List of political parties in the Federated States of Micronesia
List of rivers of the Federated States of Micronesia
List of wettest tropical cyclones to affect the Federated States of Micronesia
LGBT rights in the Federated States of Micronesia

M
Micronesia
Micronesia challenge
Military of the Federated States of Micronesia
Music of the Federated States of Micronesia

N
North Pacific Ocean
Northern Hemisphere

O
Oceania

P
Pacific Ocean
Palikir
Pohnpei
Political parties in the Federated States of Micronesia
Politics of the Federated States of Micronesia
President of the Federated States of Micronesia

Q

R
Religion in the Federated States of Micronesia
Rivers of the Federated States of Micronesia

S
Scouting in the Federated States of Micronesia
Small Island Developing States

T
Topic outline of the Federated States of Micronesia
Transportation in the Federated States of Micronesia
Tropical cyclones in the Federated States of Micronesia

U

V

W

Wikipedia:WikiProject Topic outline/Drafts/Topic outline of Micronesia

X

Y
Yap

Z

See also

List of international rankings
Lists of country-related topics
Topic outline of geography
Topic outline of the Federated States of Micronesia

External links

 
Federated States of Micronesia